Kōda Station is the name of three train stations in Japan:

 Kōda Station (Aichi) (幸田駅) in Kōta, Aichi
 Kōda Station (Nagayo) (高田駅) in Nagayo, Nagasaki
 Kōda Station (Saza) (神田駅) in Saza, Nagasaki

See also 
 高田駅 (disambiguation)
 神田駅 (disambiguation)